The 2013–14 Southern Hemisphere tropical cyclone season may refer to one of three different basins and respective seasons:

2013-14 Australian region cyclone season, between 90°E and 160°E
2013-14 South Pacific cyclone season, east of 160°E